The  Bandaranaike Airport attack was an assault by the Liberation Tigers of Tamil Eelam (LTTE) on Bandaranaike International Airport, on July 24, 2001. The attack was one of the boldest the LTTE mounted during its war with the Sri Lankan government, and had a profound impact on the country's military, economy, and airline industry.

Assault
Around 3:30 am on July 24, 14 members of the LTTE Black Tiger suicide squad infiltrated Katunayake air base, located about 35 km (22 mi) north of Colombo. After destroying electricity transformers to plunge the base into darkness, they cut through the barbed wire surrounding the base to begin their assault. Using rocket-propelled grenades, anti-tank weapons, and assault rifles, the militants attacked air force planes. They were not able to attack the aircraft parked in hangars but did destroy eight military aircraft on the tarmac: three K-8 Karakorum trainer aircraft, one Mil Mi-17 helicopter, one Mil Mi-24 helicopter, two IAI Kfir fighter jets, and a MiG-27. Five K-8s and one MiG-27 were also damaged. A total of 26 aircraft were either damaged or destroyed in the attack.
Some of the LTTE members climbed to the top of the air base's control tower, which they used as a vantage point.

Eight Tigers and three air force officers died in the battle at the air base. The six remaining LTTE members then crossed the runway to the adjacent Bandaranaike Airport. Using their weapons, they began blowing up civilian aircraft, which were all empty. One Airbus A330 was destroyed by an explosive charge, another A330 by the explosion of an oil tank; an A340 was destroyed by a rocket fired from the terminal building. In addition, an A320-200 and an A340-300 were damaged in the assault.

The attack was over by 8:30 am. All 14 guerrillas were killed, along with six Sri Lankan air force personnel and one soldier killed by friendly fire. Twelve soldiers were injured, along with three Sri Lankan civilians and a Russian engineer. No tourists were harmed during the attack.

The three Airbuses destroyed constituted three of SriLankan Airlines' 12 aircraft. The two other damaged aircraft meant that nearly half of the airline's fleet was out of commission.

Effects
Bandaranaike Airport was closed for 14 hours during and after the attack.  Flights were diverted to India during the assault due to the threat of attack. The total estimated cost of the destroyed aircraft is about $450 million, of which the Airbuses alone cost over $300 million. But there were other, bigger costs. The cost of replacing the civilian aircraft was estimated at US$350 million.  The attack caused a slowdown in the economy of Sri Lanka, to about -1.4%. Tourism also plummeted, dropping 15.5% at the end of the year.

See also
 List of attacks attributed to the LTTE

References

Attacks on military installations in the 2000s
July 2001 events in Asia
Liberation Tigers of Tamil Eelam attacks in Eelam War III
Mass murder in 2001
Terrorist attacks on airports
Terrorist incidents in Sri Lanka in 2001